Carlos Andrés García Cuña (born 6 November 1979 in Montevideo) is a retired Uruguayan footballer who was central defender.

Notes

External links
 
 

1979 births
Living people
Footballers from Montevideo
Uruguayan footballers
Association football defenders
Uruguayan Primera División players
Cypriot First Division players
Cypriot Second Division players
Serie B players
Liverpool F.C. (Montevideo) players
Peñarol players
Venezia F.C. players
Segunda División players
UD Vecindario players
Alki Larnaca FC players
APEP FC players
Nea Salamis Famagusta FC players
Racing Club de Montevideo players
Guangdong Sunray Cave players
China League One players
Uruguay international footballers
Uruguayan expatriate footballers
Expatriate footballers in Italy
Expatriate footballers in Spain
Expatriate footballers in Cyprus
Expatriate footballers in China
Uruguayan expatriate sportspeople in China